Leonidas Drosis ((1834/1836/1843 - 1882)) was a Greek neoclassical sculptor of the 19th century.

Born in Nafplion, to a German father named Von Dorsch and a Greek mother named Meksi, however he took the surname Drosis. He later studied in Athens and Munich on a scholarship provided by Simon Sinas.

Drosis's major work is the extensive neo-classical architectural ornament at the Academy of Athens, for the Danish-Austrian architect Theophil Hansen.  The Academy was also funded largely by Sinas.  Drosis sculpted the principle multi-figure pediment sculpture, on the theme of the birth of Athena, based on a design by painter Carl Rahl.  This brought first prize at the Vienna Exhibition of 1873. Drosis is also responsible for the figures of Athena and Apollo with lyre on the Academy's flanking pillars, and the seated marble figures of Plato and Socrates, which were executed "by the Italian sculptor Piccarelli". (The eight smaller pediments in the Academy complex are the terra-cotta work of Austrian sculptor Franz Melnitzky.)

Drosis died in Naples.

Gallery

References

External links 

1882 deaths
Architectural sculptors
Greek sculptors
19th-century Greek sculptors
People from Nafplion
Year of birth uncertain